Gorczyn  is a village in the administrative district of Gmina Łask, within Łask County, Łódź Voivodeship, in central Poland.

References

Gorczyn